Walter Henry Huntzinger (February 6, 1899 – August 11, 1981) was a pitcher in Major League Baseball. He played for the New York Giants, St. Louis Cardinals, and Chicago Cubs.  Huntzinger played college baseball and college basketball at the University of Pennsylvania.  He coached basketball at Haverford College from 1922 to 1924, compiling a record of 2–24.

References

External links

1899 births
1981 deaths
Major League Baseball pitchers
New York Giants (NL) players
St. Louis Cardinals players
Chicago Cubs players
Toledo Mud Hens players
Haverford Fords men's basketball coaches
Penn Quakers baseball players
Penn Quakers men's basketball players
Baseball players from Pennsylvania
Basketball coaches from Pennsylvania
Sportspeople from Pottsville, Pennsylvania